Kyrgyzstan competed in the Winter Olympic Games as an independent nation for the first time at the 1994 Winter Olympics in Lillehammer, Norway.

The Kyrgyz team did not arrive in time for the opening ceremony, and the Kyrgyz flag was carried into the Olympic arena by the designated Norwegian volunteer called Torkel Engeness. Biathlete Yevgeniya Roppel was the only competitor in Lillehammer for Kyrgyzstan.

Competitors
The following is the list of number of competitors in the Games.

Biathlon 

Women

References

Official Olympic Reports
sports-reference

Nations at the 1994 Winter Olympics
1994
1994 in Kyrgyzstani sport